Aaj Ki Taaqat is a 1992 Hindi film directed and starred by Anil Nagrath along with Upasna Singh in the lead roles.

Cast
 Anil Nagrath
 Upasna Singh
 Gautam (Pranjit Saharia)
 Sunil Puri
 Jaya Mathur

Soundtrack
Composer: Bappi Lahiri
Lyrics: Indeevar

References

1993 films
1990s Hindi-language films
Films scored by Bappi Lahiri